Pissila is a town, with a population of 23,420 (2019 census), in the province of Sanmatenga in Burkina Faso.

References

Populated places in the Centre-Nord Region
Sanmatenga Province